Estela Marcelino Perlas-Bernabe (born Estela Marcelino Perlas; May 14, 1952) is a former associate justice of the Supreme Court of the Philippines, serving from 2011 to 2022. She was the third appointee to the Supreme Court by President Benigno Aquino III on September 16, 2011.

Background
Estela Perlas-Bernabe was born in Plaridel, Bulacan. She earned her Bachelor of Science in Commerce degree, major in Banking and Finance magna cum laude at St. Paul College of Manila and earned her law degree from the Ateneo de Manila Law School graduating as Class Salutatorian in 1976. She passed the Philippine Bar examination in 1977 with a bar rating of 85.156%.

Early judicial posts
Perlas-Bernabe has served the Judiciary as Regional Trial Court Judge of Makati from January 2000 to March 2004, Metropolitan Trial Court Judge of the same City from March 1996 to January 2000, and as Technical Assistant in the Office of the Court Administrator, Supreme Court of the Philippines from 1977 to 1979. She also worked in various private and government offices, namely, as Legal Assistant, Legal Department of China Banking Corporation (1979–1980); Senior Manager, Legal Department of Paramount Finance Corp. (1980–1987); Legal Manager and Corporate Secretary/ Legal Consultant of the National Home Mortgage and Finance Corp. (1990–1993); and Senior Partner of Bernabe Perlas Morte and Associates (1993–1996).

Supreme Court of the  Philippines
Bernabe was the third appointee of President Benigno Aquino III to the Supreme Court of the Philippines as an associate justice on September 16, 2011. She replaced Conchita Carpio Morales, who retired from the Court on June 19, 2011, and later assumed the position of Ombudsman of the Philippines. She voted in favor of the burial of former president Ferdinand Marcos in the Libingan ng Mga Bayani.

External links
 Profile of the new Supreme Court Justice, Estela M. Perlas-Bernabe

References

1952 births
Living people
Ateneo de Manila University alumni
Associate Justices of the Supreme Court of the Philippines
Filipino women judges
Filipino women lawyers
Justices of the Court of Appeals of the Philippines
People from Plaridel, Bulacan
21st-century women judges